Richard Tyson is an American actor. He is best known as Kaz in Hardball (1989–1990) as well as his film roles in Three O'Clock High (1987), Two Moon Junction (1988), Kindergarten Cop (1990), Bound to Vengeance (2015), and Playing with Dolls (2015).

Biography
Tyson was born in Mobile, Alabama. His brother John was the district attorney of Mobile County, and was later the Democratic Party nominee for attorney general of Alabama in 2006.

Tyson starred in Three O'Clock High, Kindergarten Cop and three films directed by the Farrelly brothers. He starred in the television series Hardball. His roles in the 2000s included The Fear Chamber, Richard III, Flight of the Living Dead, No Bad Days and the western Shoot First and Pray You Live. He starred in the horror film Big Bad Wolf in which he is accused by his stepson of being a cruel and vicious werewolf.

Tyson played a former football star who owned the eponymous town in Jake's Corner. He guest-starred in CSI: NY, Boomtown and Martial Law. His other film appearances include The Visitation, Liar's Poker and Black Hawk Down. Tyson played Genghis Khan in an unfinished film of the same name, which was originally scheduled for release in 1992.

Filmography

Film

Television

References

External links

20th-century American male actors
21st-century American male actors
Actors from Mobile, Alabama
American male film actors
American male television actors
Cornell University alumni
Living people
United States Naval Academy alumni
University of Alabama alumni
1950s births